Gutowsky is a surname. Notable people with the surname include:

Ace Gutowsky (1909–1976), American football fullback
Herbert S. Gutowsky (1919–2000), American chemist and professor

See also
Gutowski